Killer Joe is an album by drummer Art Blakey with Japanese drummer George Kawaguchi recorded in 1981 and originally released on the Japanese Union Jazz label but later released on Storyville in the US.

Reception

Scott Yanow of Allmusic states that "This unusual LP finds Art Blakey and the Jazz Messengers adding a second drummer, the fine Japanese player George Kawaguchi, to a set featuring three standards and two Kawaguchi pieces... Fine music, although a bit of an oddity".

Track listing 
All compositions by George Kawaguchi except as indicated
 "Killer Joe" (Benny Golson) - 10:00   
 "A Night in Tunisia" (Dizzy Gillespie) - 9:15   
 "Well You Needn't" (Thelonious Monk) - 6:47   
 "Tin Tin Teo" - 6:41   
 "Big Apple Jump" - 6:36

Personnel 
George Kawaguchi, Art Blakey - drums
Wallace Roney - trumpet
Slide Hampton - trombone
Branford Marsalis - alto saxophone, tenor saxophone
Donald Brown - piano
Charles Fambrough - bass
Raiji Kawaguchi - percussion (track 2)

References 

Art Blakey albums
1982 albums
Albums produced by Teo Macero